The 2018 Virginia Cavaliers football team represents the University of Virginia during the 2018 NCAA Division I FBS football season. The Cavaliers are led by third-year head coach Bronco Mendenhall and play their home games at Scott Stadium. They compete as a member of the Coastal Division of the Atlantic Coast Conference (ACC).

Previous season
Virginia ended the 2017 season with a 6–7 overall record, 3–5 in the ACC, to finish in a tie for fourth place in the ACC Coastal Division. They were invited to the Military Bowl, where they were defeated by Navy.

Preseason

Award watch lists
Listed in the order that they were released

ACC media poll
The ACC media poll was released on July 24, 2018.

Schedule

Roster

Depth chart

Game summaries

Richmond

at Indiana

vs Ohio

Louisville

at NC State

Miami (FL)

at Duke

North Carolina

Pittsburgh

Liberty

at Georgia Tech

at Virginia Tech

vs. South Carolina (Belk Bowl)

Rankings

2019 NFL Draft

References

Virginia
Virginia Cavaliers football seasons
Duke's Mayo Bowl champion seasons
Virginia Cavaliers football